José Marcos Alves Luis (born 1 February 1998), known as Zé Marcos, is a Brazilian footballer who plays as a defender for Esporte Clube Juventude.

Club career
Born in Paraná, Brazil, Zé Marcos started playing football in Curitiba, where he played in Atlético Paranaense academy. He played with Atlético Paranaense U15 side in 2012 and 2013, and next he played with the U17 side in 2014 and 2015. In 2015 he was promoted to the main team, however, he failed to debut having been twice an unused substitute in Atlético games in the 2015 Campeonato Paranaense. In 2016 he was active with the Atlético Paranaense U20 side.

In summer 2017, Zé Marcos moved to Europe and joined Red Star Belgrade. He signed a four-year professional contract with the club on 7 July 2017. He was training with first squad in the first half of the 2017–18 season, but failed to make any official appearance for the club until the end of 2017. In the mid-season, he was loaned to Rad for the rest of the 2017–18 Serbian SuperLiga campaign, as the first foreign footballer after 5 years. Zé Marcos made his professional debut for Rad in 1–1 draw to Radnik Surdulica on 17 February 2018. He scored his first senior goal in 5–0 victory over Borac Čačak in 25th SuperLiga fixture, played on 3 March 2018. Following the end of season, Zé Marcos returned to Red Star. On the last day of the summer transfer window 2018, he moved on new loan to Rad until the end of the calendar year.

International career
Zé Marcos played with Brazilian under-15 national team at the 2013 South American Under-15 Football Championship. Next, Zé Marcos was a member of Brazilian under-17 national team in 2015. He appeared in the 2015 South American Under-17 Football Championship, helping Brazil to win the competition. He also led the team as a captain in the 2015 FIFA U-17 World Cup.

Style of play
Standing at 6-foot-2-inches (1.88 m), Zé Marcos is a left-footed footballer, who mainly operates as a centre-back. Although he has started playing football as a left-back, he adapted in the middle of defence due to his high. He is characterised as dominant in positioning, having good heading abilities, as also leadership characteristics. He is also described as a fast player with solid technique, dangerous in the offensive interruptions.

Career statistics

Club

Honours
Brazil U17
South American Under-17 Football Championship: 2015 (gold medal)

Notes

References

External links
 
 
 
 

1998 births
Living people
Sportspeople from Paraná (state)
Brazilian footballers
Association football central defenders
Campeonato Brasileiro Série A players
Club Athletico Paranaense players
Avaí FC players
Criciúma Esporte Clube players
Serbian SuperLiga players
Red Star Belgrade footballers
FK Rad players
Brazil youth international footballers
Brazilian expatriate footballers
Brazilian expatriate sportspeople in Serbia
Expatriate footballers in Serbia